My Heart may refer to:

Music

Albums
 My Heart (Donell Jones album), 1996
 My Heart (Lorrie Morgan album), 1999
 My Heart (Sissel Kyrkjebø album), 2003/2004
 My Heart, Gold-selling album from Martina McBride discography for Hallmark Cards 2005
 My Heart (Doris Day album), 2011

Songs
 "My Heart (Intro)", a 2010 song by Christina Aguilera from Bionic
 "My Heart", a 1959 single by Gene Vincent
 "My Heart" (Ronnie Milsap song), 1980
 "My Heart", a 2005 song by Paramore from All We Know Is Falling
 "My Heart", a 2008 song by Lizz Wright